Brian Albert Charlton (born May 22, 1947) is a former politician in Ontario, Canada. He was a New Democratic member of the Legislative Assembly of Ontario from 1977 to 1995 who represented the riding of Hamilton Mountain. He served as a cabinet minister in the government of Bob Rae. He serves on the board of directors of a sustainable living non-profit called Green Venture.

Background
Charlton worked as a property assessor before entering political life.  His father, John Charlton, was a candidate for the Ontario NDP in the 1963 provincial election in the riding of Wentworth. His wife Chris Charlton has campaigned for federal, provincial and municipal office numerous times since 1997, being elected in 2006 and re-elected since as Federal NDP Member of Parliament for Hamilton Mountain.

Politics

In opposition
Charlton ran for the Ontario legislature in the provincial election of 1975, but lost to Progressive Conservative John Smith by 1,667 votes in Hamilton Mountain. He ran again in the 1977 provincial election, and defeated Smith by 373 votes.

In 1979, Charlton sponsored a private member's bill that would have given domestic workers the same protection as regular workers including a minimum wage of $3. At the time domestic workers were excluded form such protections as human rights, worker's compensation and minimum pay. The governing Tories killed the bill saying that many people could not afford to pay these workers such a high wage. In 1980, he proposed an affirmative action bill that would have promoted equal pay for women and other job protections. The bill was blocked by the Tories.

He was re-elected over Progressive Conservative Duncan Beattie in the 1981 provincial election by 197 votes. He was appointed as the party's environment critic. In 1982, Charlton proposed a bill called the Safe Drinking Water Act that would have protected water sources for human consumption. The bill was never passed but was a forerunner for legislation passed twenty years later in response to the Walkerton Inquiry. Charlton supported Bob Rae for the provincial NDP leadership in 1982.

He was re-elected by a greater margin in the 1985 provincial election, and defeated Liberal Jane Milanetti by 1,632 votes in the 1987 election. After the election he was appointed as the party's energy critic.

In government
The NDP won a majority government in the 1990 provincial election, and Charlton was re-elected by a landslide. After the election he was named as parliamentary assistant to the Minister of Energy, Jenny Carter.

He was appointed to cabinet on March 18, 1991, as Minister of Financial Institutions. He was also named Minister Responsible for Auto Insurance. He was named acting Minister of Energy on February 14, 1992, finally being appointed to the full portfolio on September 23 of the same year.  Following a cabinet shuffle on February 3, 1993, he was named Chair of the Management Board of Cabinet as well as government House Leader.

After campaigning on a platform of publicly funded automobile insurance, the New Democrats backtracked due to the recession in the 1990s. Charlton took over management of the issue in 1991 and handled it through to the passing of Bill 164 in July 1993. The bill increased benefits for accident victims under the new no-fault system.

As Chair of the Management Board, Charlton faced a broad range of issues that concerned the public. However, one issue in particular raised a few eyebrows. In 1993 the government published a job advertisement for a management board director. The ad read that competition was limited to, "...aboriginal peoples, francophones, persons with disabilities, racial minorities and women." Many read this to mean that "white males" would be excluded and that this was a broad-minded government policy. Charlton said, "Most of the backlash was in fact the impression that all government jobs were going to be handled in that way, which wasn't correct." The government pulled the ad after the ensuing controversy.

In February 1995, Charlton suffered a heart attack and was hospitalized but returned to work three weeks later.  He ran in the June 1995 provincial election but he finished third behind Liberal Marie Bountrogianni and the winner, Progressive Conservative Trevor Pettit.

Cabinet positions

Later life
After leaving office, Charlton worked as an executive assistant to Howard Hampton, the Ontario NDP leader who followed Bob Rae.

As of 2012, Charlton is the past chair of Green Venture, a non-profit group which focuses on sustainable living initiatives. and has chaired employment adjustment committees for the Hamilton Steelworkers Area Council and the Canadian Auto Workers.

Electoral record

References

External links

1947 births
Canadian socialists
Living people
Members of the Executive Council of Ontario
Ontario New Democratic Party MPPs
Politicians from Hamilton, Ontario